Catherine Faux is a British professional triathlete.

2013 Ironman World Championship
Faux finished 10th overall (including professionals) at the 2013 Ironman World Championship and was the top female age grouper.  This performance set the course record for a female amateur at 9:15:16.

Sabbatical and return as a professional 
Faux broke from triathlon in 2014 to complete two years working as a junior doctor.

She then returned as a professional and made her Ironman debut as a pro in August 2016 at Ironman Vichy where she came first.

Personal life
Faux attended the University of Sheffield where she studied medicine, graduating in 2014.

References

Living people
British female triathletes
People educated at Stamford High School, Lincolnshire
Alumni of the University of Sheffield
Year of birth missing (living people)
Place of birth missing (living people)